The Spats were a New Zealand band operating between 1977 and 1979. Members included Fane Flaws, Peter Dasent, Bruno Lawrence and Tony Backhouse. Spats worked with the Limbs Dance Company, a contemporary dance company based in New Zealand. One piece was called New Wave Goodbye.

References

New Zealand musical groups
Musical groups established in 1977
Musical groups disestablished in 1979